Tuvalu is a 2006 novel by Australian author Andrew O'Connor. It won The Australian/Vogel Literary Award for unpublished manuscripts by writers under 35.

Plot introduction
The novel is set mostly in Tokyo and tells the story of a young Australian teacher of English, and his relationship with two women, Tilly, another Australian English teacher, and Mami, a Japanese hotel heiress. It is told in first-person.

Explanation of the novel's title
Tuvalu is a small Pacific island nation.  It doesn't appear in the novel except as an idea. Tilly describes it to Noah as follows:
I guess for me Tuvalu's always done the trick. I've never been anywhere near it. I've never even studied it. For all I know it might well have sunk. But that one word's taken on a meaning all of its own. [...] Haven't you ever once looked into the future and pictured a different life for yourself, made it a destination in some abstract way? A place in which you are content and from which you never look forward, except maybe to hope for more of the same?

Awards
2007: Commonwealth Writers' Prize SE Asia and South Pacific, Best First Novel: Winner
2005: The Australian/Vogel Literary Award: Winner

Reviews
Delaney, Brigid (2005) "The loneliness of the long-distance writer pays off", The Sydney Morning Herald, 20 January 2005 
Dooley, Gillian (2006) Review of 'Tuvalu' by Andrew O'Connor, recorded for Writers Radio, Radio Adelaide, 6 October 2006

References

2006 Australian novels
Novels set in Tokyo
Japan in non-Japanese culture